Thomas or Tom Thornton may refer to:

Clergymen
Thomas Thornton (academic administrator) (c. 1541–1629), English Church of England clergyman and academic administrator
Thomas C. Thornton (1794–1860), American Methodist minister and educator

Public officials 
Thomas de Thornton, English MP for Lancashire in 1313, 1320 and 1328
Thomas Thornton (merchant) (1762–1814), English trade consul and writer on Turkey
Thomas Thornton (politician) (1831–1897), American member of Wisconsin State Assembly
Thomas Henry Thornton (1832–1913), English Indian civil servant, judge and author
Thomas Patrick Thornton (1898–1985), American federal judge

Sportsmen
Thomas Thornton (sportsman, died 1823) (1751/2–1823), English huntsman and falconer
Tom Thornton (footballer) (1885–1951), English footballer
Thomas Thornton (cricketer) (1922–1987), English right-handed batsman
Tom Thornton (cricketer) (born 1989), Australian right-handed batsman